Emily M. Danforth (born January 17, 1980) is an American author.

Early life and education
Danforth was born and raised in Miles City, Montana. She attended Hofstra University, where she came out. She received a Master of Fine Arts degree from the University of Montana and earned her Ph.D. at the University of Nebraska–Lincoln. She lives in Providence, Rhode Island with her wife.

Novels

Her debut novel, The Miseducation of Cameron Post, was published in February 2012. This book became the basis for a 2018 film with the same name.

Her second novel, published in 2020, is Plain Bad Heroines. The book is set in a Rhode Island boarding school and the Los Angeles film industry.

References

External links
Danforth's biography on her website
Author profile on Goodreads

1980 births
Living people
21st-century American novelists
American women novelists
Hofstra University alumni
American lesbian writers
People from Miles City, Montana
Rhode Island College faculty
University of Montana alumni
University of Nebraska–Lincoln alumni
American LGBT novelists
LGBT people from Montana
21st-century American women writers
Novelists from Montana
American women academics